Mount Milton is a mountain  high located  south-southeast of Mount Craddock and  southeast of Mount Southwick, in the southern part of the Sentinel Range in the Ellsworth Mountains of Antarctica. It overlooks Kornicker Glacier to the northeast and Sirma Glacier to the west. Mount Milton was first mapped by the United States Geological Survey from surveys and U.S. Navy air photos, 1957–59, and was named by the Advisory Committee on Antarctic Names for Patrick G. Milton, aviation machinist's mate, U.S. Navy, who served as plane captain on a reconnaissance flight to these mountains on January 28, 1958.

Maps
 Vinson Massif.  Scale 1:250 000 topographic map.  Reston, Virginia: US Geological Survey, 1988.

References

External links
 SCAR Composite Gazetteer of Antarctica.

Ellsworth Mountains
Mountains of Ellsworth Land